Palipraxia is a rare complex tic involving the involuntary repetition of one's own movements.  It is associated with Tourette syndrome and may be associated with epilepsy.

References

Tourette syndrome